Charles Wesley Vursell (February 8, 1881 – September 21, 1974) was a U.S. Representative from Illinois.

Background
Born in Salem, Illinois, Vursell attended the public schools of Marion County, Illinois.

Career
In 1904, Vursell was a hardware merchant. He was the sheriff of Marion County from 1910 to 1914. He served as member of the State house of representatives from 1914 to 1916. He was owner and publisher of the Salem Republican from 1916 to 1948.

Vursell was elected as a Republican to the Seventy-eighth and to the seven succeeding Congresses (January 3, 1943 - January 3, 1959). In 1947–8, he served on the Herter Committee.   Vursell voted in favor of the Civil Rights Act of 1957. He was an unsuccessful candidate for reelection in 1958 to the Eighty-sixth Congress. He retired and resided in Salem, Illinois, where he died September 21, 1974. He was interred in East Lawn Cemetery.

Vursell's cousin Carl Albert served as a member of Congress from Oklahoma, and was Speaker of the House from 1971 to 1977.

References

1881 births
1974 deaths
People from Salem, Illinois
Hardware merchants
American newspaper publishers (people)
Illinois sheriffs
Republican Party members of the United States House of Representatives from Illinois
Republican Party members of the Illinois House of Representatives
20th-century American politicians
Journalists from Illinois